Emily Wardill (born 1977 in Rugby, England), is a British artist and film maker.

She studied fine art at Central St. Martins College of Arts and Design in London. In 2010, Wardill was awarded the Film London Artists' Moving Image Network Jarman Award, which allowed her to show her works on national television in the UK. Wardill was awarded a Philip Leverhulme Prize in Visual and Performing Arts in 2011.

Wardill has exhibited her works internationally, in Australia, Denmark, Germany, Italy, the Netherlands, Norway, Portugal, and the United States. Wardill's work has been exhibited at Art Basel, the Serpentine Gallery, Tate Britain, and the Venice Biennale. Her films have appeared in the International Film Festival Rotterdam, London Film Festival, Oberhausen International Short Film Festival, and Toronto International Film Festival.

She has created both shorts and feature-length films. Her film subjects include ghost stories, mental illness, religion, and contemporary art and visual culture.

Notes

1977 births
Alumni of Central Saint Martins
English filmmakers
Living people
People from Rugby, Warwickshire
British contemporary artists
English contemporary artists